This is a list of songs that have peaked at number-one on the Radio & Records singles chart in the 1970s.

1973

1974

1975

1976

1977

1978

1979

Radio
1970s in American music
1970s record charts